The 2000 Harrogate Council election took place on 4 May 2000 to elect members of Harrogate Borough Council in North Yorkshire, England. One third of the council was up for election and the Liberal Democrats stayed in overall control of the council.

After the election, the composition of the council was:
Liberal Democrat 40
Conservative 18
Labour 1

Campaign
19 of the 59 seats were contested in the election with the Liberal Democrats defending 14, the Conservatives 4 and Labour 1 seat. Close contests were expected in Killinghall and the 2 wards in Ripon, with the Liberal Democrats hoping to make gains despite criticism over the handling of the redevelopment of the area around a bus station.

Election result
The results saw the Liberal Democrats remain in control of the council, despite the Conservative party gaining seats. The Liberal Democrats finished the election with 40 seats, with the seats held by the party including the two in Ripon, which were narrowly won over the Conservatives. The Conservatives finished with 18 seats, while Labour was reduced to only one seat after losing a seat.

Ward results

References

2000
2000 English local elections
2000s in North Yorkshire